The Central District of Ardakan County is in Yazd province, Iran. At the National Census in 2006, its population was 59,127 in 15,752 households. The following census in 2011 counted 65,406 people in 18,792 households. At the latest census in 2016, the district had 86,578 inhabitants in 25,664 households.

References 

Ardakan County

Districts of Yazd Province

Populated places in Yazd Province

Populated places in Ardakan County